Mynor Iván González León (born 16 August 1982) is a Guatemalan former footballer. After receiving his MBA from the Wharton School of the University of Pennsylvania, he now serves as the Vice President of Financial Planning and Analysis at Topgolf.

Career statistics

International

References

External links
 Mynor González at the Southern Methodist University

1982 births
Living people
Sportspeople from Guatemala City
Southern Methodist University alumni
Guatemalan footballers
Guatemalan expatriate footballers
Guatemala youth international footballers
Guatemala international footballers
Association football defenders
Guatemalan expatriate sportspeople in the United States
Expatriate soccer players in the United States